Aaaah or Aah is a 2014 Indian Tamil-language anthology horror film written and directed by Hari & Harish, in their third venture following Orr Eravuu (2010) and Ambuli (2012). The film stars Gokulnath, Meghna, Bala Saravanan, and Bobby Simha. It features five different horror stories shot in five different places; Japan, Dubai, the midsea of the Bay of Bengal, a highway in Andhra Pradesh and a remote ATM booth in Tamil Nadu. The film was produced by KTVR Creative Frames, it was released on 28 November 2014 to mixed to positive reviews but had average collections.

Plot 
Three friends - Thamizh, Cherry and Singaram - are meeting at their reunion. They are being drawn into a bet to prove the presence of ghosts by a rich schoolmate Prosper. This leads them to a journey to five different places around the world suspected to be haunted. Namely, events which had unfolded in Japan, Dubai, the mid-sea of the Bay of Bengal, a highway in Andhra Pradesh, and a remote ATM booth in Tamil Nadu. They fail to capture ghosts in cameras in all the cases. They are now worried that they would lose the 60 crore prize amount and Prosper would win. Meanwhile, they learn about a video footage in which a ghost is sighted killing the ATM watchmen. The video footage is in a pen drive owned by Bosskey, the owner of the security company in which the ATM security guard was employed. When he learns of the huge reward money for a video footage proving existence of ghosts, he demands 50 lakhs for the pen drive. Cherry approaches Prosper to get 50 lakhs. Instead, Prosper tries to take advantage of the situation and behaves indecently with her. Cherry becomes annoyed and returns home and narrates the incident to Thamizh and Singaram. That night, Cherry gets a call from her lover Salim, and with shock and fear, she utters one word: "accident". The three friends visit the place and find Salim dying. Before dying, he narrates the incident and records it in his camera. Salim and his friends, while traveling in a car, watch a movie from a CD which they had picked up from a vendor who states that it is an unreleased movie. As they watch the movie, the same incidents start happening to them as shown in the movie. Soon after, all of them are killed, and Salim was able to bury the CD. The CD was found, but before they could get hold of it, all three friends are killed by the ghost. Prosper, after winning the bet, reclaims and rejoices his prize, a Yamaha RX 100. After hearing the doorbell ring, Prosper opens it, only to be killed by a ghost.

Cast  
 Ambuli Gokulnath as Thamizh
 Meghna as Cherry
 Bala Saravanan as Singaram
 Bobby Simha as Prosper
 M. S. Bhaskar as Guru
 P. S. Srijith as Ranga
 Bosskey as Security Company Owner
 Ajai as Salim
 Takehiro Shiraga as Patient/Ghost
 Ashokan as Prosper's uncle
 Gaana Bala in a special appearance
 Sandy in a special appearance

See also 
 Ambuli - The previous film written and directed by Hari Shankar and Harish Narayan

References

External links 
 
 

2014 films
2010s Tamil-language films
Indian horror films
2014 horror films